Joachim Cuntz (born 28 September 1948 in Mannheim) is a German mathematician, currently a professor at the University of Münster.

Work 
Joachim Cuntz has made fundamental contributions to the area of C*-algebras and to the field of noncommutative geometry in the sense of Alain Connes. He initiated the analysis of the structure of simple C*-algebras and introduced new methods and examples, including the Cuntz algebras and the Cuntz semigroup. He was one of the first to apply K-theory to noncommutative operator algebras and contributed to the development of that theory. In collaboration with Daniel Quillen, he developed a new approach to cyclic cohomology and proved the excision property of periodic cyclic theory. In recent years, he has been working mainly on C*-algebras that are related to structures from number theory.

Joachim Cuntz had dozens of PhD students and research assistants, many of which are professors in mathematics today. Among them are:
 Xin Li (PhD 2010, professor of mathematics at the University of Glasgow)
 Ralf Meyer (PhD 1999, professor of mathematics at the University of Göttingen)
 Andreas Thom (PhD 2003, professor of geometry at the TU Dresden)
 Christian Voigt (PhD 2003, professor of mathematics at the University of Glasgow)
 Moritz Weber (PhD 2011, junior professor of mathematics at Saarland University)
 Wilhelm Winter (PhD 2000, professor of mathematics at the University of Münster)
 Joachim Zacharias (PhD 1996, professor of mathematics at the University of Glasgow)

Awards and honors
 1990 Invited speaker at the International Congress of Mathematicians in Kyoto (Cyclic Cohomology and K-homology).
 Max Planck Research Award (together with G. Kasparov), 1993
 Medal of the Collège de France, 1997
 Gottfried Wilhelm Leibniz Prize of the DFG 1999,
 Honorary doctorate from the University of Copenhagen
 ERC Advanced Investigators Grant, 2010
 Fellow of the American Mathematical Society, 2012

References

Further reading
 

20th-century German mathematicians
21st-century German mathematicians
Fellows of the American Mathematical Society
Living people
1948 births